Samuel Starkweather (December 27, 1799 – July 5, 1876) was the seventh mayor of Cleveland, Ohio from 1844 to 1845 and the fifteenth mayor of Cleveland from 1857 to 1858.

Starkweather was born in Pawtucket, Rhode Island to Oliver and Miriam (Clay) Starkweather. He graduated from Brown College in 1822, tutored there until 1824, and then left to study law in Windham, Connecticut. Starkweather was admitted to the bar in Columbus in 1826. Starkweather moved to Cleveland soon after and joined the Cleveland Grays in 1837, where he took a prominent position in Cleveland politics. Starkweather was elected mayor in 1844, won reelection in 1845, and again in 1857 for a 2-year term. He was the first judge of the Cuyahoga Court of Common Pleas elected under the new Constitution and served a 5-year term.  Starkweather helped establish the first high school in Cleveland. He also promoted railroads in Cleveland and helped establish the Cleveland, Columbus and Cincinnati Railroad.

He was collector of the ports of Cleveland, and built a lighthouse of which he was superintendent in 1831. The US Treasury paid him $4,997.00 on the lighthouse and $113.30 for expenditures for it. The land cost $1,000.00. He also built a lighthouse on Turtle Island, Lake Erie, Port Clinton OH in 1832 for which the US Government paid him $1,068.43. The US Government also paid him in 1831 for the support and maintenance of the lighthouses, floating lights, beacons, buoys, and stakeages. He also built or established a marine hospital on which the US Treasury paid him $147.17.

Starkweather married Julia Judd on June 25, 1828. Their 4 children were Sarah, Samuel, William, and Julia. Starkweather is buried in Lake View Cemetery.

References
 The Encyclopedia Of Cleveland History by Cleveland Bicentennial Commission (Cleveland, Ohio), David D. Van Tassel (Editor), and John J. Grabowski (Editor) 
Starkweather, Carlton Lee, M.D.  Robert Starkweather and his Descendants, Knapp, Peck and Thomson, 1904.

External links
 

1799 births
1876 deaths
Politicians from Pawtucket, Rhode Island
Mayors of Cleveland
Burials at Lake View Cemetery, Cleveland
Brown University alumni
Ohio lawyers
Ohio Democrats
19th-century American politicians
19th-century American lawyers